Chen Jui-lien (born 2 June 1971) is a Taiwanese weightlifter, competing in the 63 kg category and representing Chinese Taipei at international competitions. She competed at world championships, most recently at the 1999 World Weightlifting Championships.

She is a former world record holder with a total score (Clean & Jerk + Snatch) of 240.0 kg, set in Athens, Greece on 29 November 1999. The record was broken by Chen Xiaomin with a total score of 242.5 kg during the 2000 Summer Olympics on 19 September 2000.

Major results

See also
 1999 World Weightlifting Championships
 1998 World Weightlifting Championships
 List of World Championships medalists in weightlifting (women)
 1995 World Weightlifting Championships

References

Further reading
 More shame for Taiwan's athletes
 LA Times: Romanians Sent Out of the Games
 Associated Press: Drug cases at Sydney
 China Post: Banned lifter Chen announces retirement
 Money can't buy Olympic re-entry
 Taiwan officials accept IWF's decision
 Romania weightlifting team expelled from Olympics for drugs
 ABC News: Romanian Weightlifters Disqualified
 Taiwanese weightlifter sent home for doping

External links
 

1971 births
Living people
Taiwanese female weightlifters
Place of birth missing (living people)
Weightlifters at the 1998 Asian Games
Asian Games bronze medalists for Chinese Taipei
World Weightlifting Championships medalists
World record setters in weightlifting
Asian Games medalists in weightlifting
Medalists at the 1998 Asian Games
20th-century Taiwanese women